The Cessna 425, known as the Corsair and later as the Conquest I, is an eight-seat American pressurized turboprop twin-engined light aircraft. Now out of production, it was built by Cessna Aircraft of Wichita, Kansas, between 1980 and 1986.

Design and development 
The 425 was introduced as a competitor to the Beechcraft King Air. The 425 was introduced in 1980 and was a derivation of the Cessna 421, powered by two  Pratt & Whitney PT6 engines. In comparison to the King Air C90 "the result was an $875,000 pressurized twin-turboprop that could fly 15 knots to 20 knots faster than the C90, cruise 250 miles farther with four passengers aboard and burn 15-percent less fuel. It also costs $200,000 less to buy".

The 425 was very easy to fly and was noted by reviewers for its spacious cabin with large windows for good visibility and comfortable seats.

The original Corsair was developed into the Conquest I by customer demand for more cabin space and a higher maximum takeoff weight.  Cessna worked on upgrades that would allow more cabin space and passengers. Essentially, the upgrades increased maximum takeoff weight. The Cessna 441 had previous been called the Conquest, but was renamed the Conquest II. Earlier model Corsairs can be upgraded to Conquest I standard with factory provided modification kits.

Due to economic conditions in general aviation, sales decreased in the mid-1980s and production of the 425 ended in 1986.

Specifications (Cessna 425 - 1982 Corsair)

See also

References

External links

AVweb detailed review: Cessna Conquest I

425
1970s United States civil utility aircraft
Low-wing aircraft
Aircraft first flown in 1978
Twin-turboprop tractor aircraft